"In Vain" is a song recorded by the Dutch pop rock music singer Kim-Lian. It was released as the second single from her second album Just Do It on 10 October 2006.

Formats and track listing
CD single
"In Vain"

Maxi single
"In Vain" - 3:32
"In Vain" [Guitar Down Mix] - 3:28
"In Vain" [Instrumental] - 3:31
"Road to Heaven" [Club Remix From Israel] - 4:54

Charts

External links
Kim-Lian Official Site

Kim-Lian songs
2006 singles
2006 songs